253 (two hundred [and] fifty-three) is the natural number following 252 and preceding 254.

In mathematics
253 is:
a semiprime since it is the product of 2 primes.
a triangular number.
a star number.
a centered heptagonal number.
a centered nonagonal number.
a Blum integer.
a member of the 13-aliquot tree.

References

Integers